Palirisa rotundala is a moth in the family Eupterotidae. It was described by Rudolf Mell in 1929. It is found in China.

References

Moths described in 1929
Eupterotinae